The discography of European electronic music group The Orb includes sixteen studio albums, one live album, six compilation albums, four remix albums, four mix albums, two video albums, ten extended plays, fifteen singles and twenty-two music videos. Founded by Alex Paterson and Jimmy Cauty in 1988, the group's first release was the extended play Kiss EP, issued in May 1989. The single "A Huge Ever Growing Pulsating Brain That Rules from the Centre of the Ultraworld", which marked the group's first foray into the ambient house genre, was released in October 1989 on Adam Morris and Martin Glover's record label WAU! Mr. Modo Recordings. It was later re-issued by Big Life and peaked at number 78 in the United Kingdom despite sample clearance issues. Following Cauty's departure from the group, The Orb signed a long-term recording contract with Big Life and released their debut studio album The Orb's Adventures Beyond the Ultraworld in April 1991. It peaked at number 29 in the United Kingdom and has since been recognized as a seminal album of the ambient house genre. "Little Fluffy Clouds" and "Perpetual Dawn" were released as singles from the album.

The Orb's second studio album U.F.Orb was released in June 1992 and topped the United Kingdom albums chart. The album's second single "Blue Room" – at a length of 39 minutes and 57 seconds – became the longest-running release to enter the UK Singles Chart, where it peaked at number eight. Following the success of U.F.Orb, the group signed to Island Records and released the live album Live 93 on the label. "Little Fluffy Clouds" and "Perpetual Dawn" were re-issued and became top 20 hits in the UK. The Orb's third studio album Orbus Terrarum was released in April 1995, charting at number twenty in the UK and producing the single "Oxbow Lakes". Orblivion followed in February 1997 and peaked at number nineteen in the United Kingdom; it also became the group's first album to chart in the United States, peaking at number 174 on the Billboard 200 chart. "Toxygene" became their first UK top five single and also charted at number 23 in Ireland.

The Orb's fifth studio album Cydonia was released in February 2001 following several delays, peaking at number 83 in the United Kingdom. The group subsequently left Island Records and released several albums on assorted labels: Bicycles & Tricycles (2004) on Cooking Vinyl, Okie Dokie It's The Orb on Kompakt (2005) on Kompakt, The Dream (2007) on Liquid Sound Design and Baghdad Batteries (Orbsessions Volume III) (2010) on Malicious Damage. Metallic Spheres, a collaboration with former Pink Floyd musician David Gilmour, was released in October 2010. It gave the group their highest-charting album in the UK since U.F.Orb, peaking at number twelve on the country's albums chart. Metallic Spheres also charted in several European countries, including Belgium, Greece and Ireland. The Orb then collaborated with Jamaican reggae musician Lee "Scratch" Perry on the albums The Orbserver in the Star House (2012) and More Tales from the Orbservatory (2013). More recently, The Orb have returned to their ambient roots, collaborating with Roger Eno and other musicians to produce Moonbuilding 2703 AD in 2015, COW / Chill Out, World! in 2016 and No Sounds Are Out of Bounds in 2018.

Albums

Studio albums

Live albums

Compilation albums

Remix albums

Mix albums

Video albums

Extended plays

Singles

Remix work

1991
 Pato Banton - "Beams of Light"
 Big Audio Dynamite II - "The Globe"
 Fortran 5 - "Groove"
 Front 242 - "Rhythm of Time"
 Love Kittens - "What Goes On?"
 Primal Scream - "Higher Than the Sun"
 Sun Electric - "Red Summer"
 Suzuki K1 >> 7.5cc - "Satellite Serenade"
 System 7 - "Miracle"
 System 7 - "Sunburst"
 Time Unlimited - "Men of Wadodem"
 Wendy & Lisa - "Staring at the Sun"
 Wir - "So and Slow It Grows"
 Zodiac Youth - "Fast Forward the Future"
1992
 Blue Pearl - "Mother Dawn"
 Mystic Knights - "Ragga-nam-poiser"
 Mike Oldfield - "Sentinel"
 Lisa Stansfield - "Time to Make You Mine"
 System 7 - "Altitude"
 Yellow Magic Orchestra - "Tong Poo"
1993
 Electrot'ete - "I Love You"
 Front 242 - "Crapage"
 The Grid - "Crystal Clear"
 Haruomi Hosono - "Laughter Meditation"
 Material - "Mantra"
 Maurizio - "Ploy"
 U2 - "Numb" (unreleased)
 Yellow Magic Orchestra - "Technodon Remixes II"
1994
 Saxophonettes - "Secret Squirrel"
1995
 Innersphere - "Out of Body"
 Pop Will Eat Itself - "Home"
 Spectre - "Spectre Overseas"
 Yello - "You Gotta Say Yes to Another Excess"
1996
 The Cranberries - "Zombie"
 Gut/Lane - "Firething"
 Killing Joke - "Democracy"
 Penguin Cafe Orchestra - "Music for Found Harmonium"
 Prong - Rude Awakening
 Rick Wright - "Runaway"
1997
 Audioweb - "Faker"
 Can - "Halleluwah"
 Dolls Head - "It's Over, It's Under"
 Gong - "A PHP's Advice"
 Meat Beat Manifesto - "Radio Babylon"
 Nine Inch Nails - "The Perfect Drug"
 Tangerine Dream - "Towards The Evening Star"
 Tubeway Army - "Jo the Waiter"
1998
 Anaesthesia - "Dirty Kiss"
 Mindless Drug Hoover - "The Reefer Song"
1999
 D-Kiku - "Primitive..."
 One True Parker - "Singing Ringing Tune"
2000
 The Damage Manual - "Sunset Gun"
 Ayumi Hamasaki - "Monochrome"
 Denez Prigent - "Heart of Black Hole"
 Semisonic - "Secret Smile"
2001
 Another Fine Day - "Scarborough Fair"
 Electric Chairs - "Barbie Girl"
 Electrical Lovers - "Nijyu Rasen"
 Ayumi Hamasaki - "End of the World"
 Keith Hudson - "I'm Alright..."
 Suns of Arqa - "Children of Jumma"
 Witchman - "Angel Art"
 Yasuaki Shimizu - "Morocco Mole"
2002
 Creature - "Stuffed Hostage"
 Indochine - "Mao Boy"
 Serge Gainsbourg - "Requiem Pour Un C..."
2003
 Mika Nakashima - "Find the Way"
2004
 Ulf Lohmann - "Because Before"
 Hybrid - "Higher Than a Skyscraper"
2005
 Headcount - "Die Monkey Die"
2008
 Infadels - "Circus of the Mad"
 Louis Armstrong - "What a Wonderful World"
 Transit Kings - "The Last Lighthouse Keepers"
2009
 Transmission - "Dance Alone"
2010
 Coldcut & Hexstatic - "Timber"
2011
 Shrubbn! - Echos
2018
 Space - Magic Fly

Music videos

References

External links
 Official website
 The Orb at AllMusic
 
 

Discographies of British artists
Electronic music discographies
Discography